XHZK-FM is a radio station on 96.7 FM in Tepatitlán de Morelos, Jalisco. It is known as Poder 55.

History
XEZK-AM 1600 received its concession on November 6, 1960. It was owned by José Ismael Alvarado Robles and known as Radio Alteña. The 250-watt station increased power to 1 kW day by the 1980s, and in the 1990s it moved to 550 kHz and increased power to 2.5 kW day and 1 kW night.

XEZK was authorized for AM-FM migration in 2011.

References

Radio stations in Jalisco